Michael Paul Trevor Bostwick (born 17 May 1988) is an English professional footballer who plays as a defender for EFL League Two club Stevenage.

Bostwick started his career at Millwall, and played regularly for the club's under-18 team and reserve team. At the age of 17, he joined Conference National club Crawley Town on a work experience loan during the latter stages of 2005–06 season. Bostwick played regularly for Crawley until he was recalled by Millwall in January 2007. He was told he was surplus to requirements at the club and subsequently signed for Rushden & Diamonds on an 18-month contract, where he played eight matches before being released by Rushden at the end of the 2006–07 season. He joined Ebbsfleet United in August 2007 ahead of the 2007–08 season, helping Ebbsfleet win the FA Trophy at Wembley Stadium in May 2008. 

Bostwick rejected a contract offer from Ebbsfleet, and signed for Stevenage Borough shortly after the FA Trophy success. He played regularly in the club's defence and midfield throughout his time at Stevenage, winning the FA Trophy once again in May 2009 and helping the club earn back-to-back promotions from the Conference Premier into League One. After four years at Stevenage, Bostwick signed for Championship club Peterborough United in July 2012, where he spent five seasons; playing 228 times and helping the club win the Football League Trophy in 2014. He then joined Lincoln City ahead of the 2017–18 season, winning the EFL Trophy in 2018 before being named the club's Player of the Year as they finished the 2018–19 season as League Two champions. Bostwick signed for fellow League One club Burton Albion in August 2020, before rejoining former club Stevenage, initially on loan in January 2022, and then on a permanent basis in May 2022.

Early life
Bostwick was born in Eltham, Greater London and grew up in South East London. Bostwick supports West Ham United, and his footballing hero when growing up was Rio Ferdinand.

Club career

Millwall
Bostwick began his career as a trainee with Millwall, and was a regular in the club's under-18 team, as well as playing several times for the reserve team. During the latter stages of the 2005–06 season, Bostwick joined Conference National club Crawley Town on work experience. The move counted as work experience, as opposed to a loan, because of Bostwick's age; subsequently he could not appear for the first team of another Football League club, but was eligible to play for the first team of a non-League club. He made his debut for Crawley a week after joining the club, coming on as an 89th-minute substitute in a 1–0 victory against Forest Green Rovers on 18 March 2006. He subsequently started his first match on 15 April 2006, playing the whole match in a 2–0 victory against Aldershot Town, scoring Crawley's second goal. He played eight times for Crawley during his two-month work experience, scoring three goals. On his return to his parent club in May 2006, Bostwick signed a one-year contract with Millwall.

Shortly before the start of the 2006–07 season, Bostwick was loaned out to Crawley Town for a second spell at the club. He played in the club's first five matches of the season, scoring twice from midfield in a 3–2 away win at Stevenage Borough on 18 August 2006. Crawley Town extended the loan deal until the end of the season on 31 August 2006, although Millwall were able to recall him in the January transfer window if they deemed it necessary. Bostwick played 25 times during the first half of the season, scoring twice, before Millwall recalled him in January 2007.

Rushden & Diamonds
Having made no first-team appearances for Millwall, Bostwick was allowed to leave the club on a free transfer to sign for Rushden & Diamonds on an 18-month contract. Rushden were managed by Graham Westley, who had previously written about Bostwick's credentials in his weekly column in The Non-League Paper when Westley was out of work. Bostwick made his Rushden debut in the club's 2–1 away win at league leaders Dagenham & Redbridge on 10 February 2007. He was sent-off for the first time in his career in Rushden's 2–2 draw with Aldershot Town on 24 March 2007, receiving a red card for two bookable offences. Bostwick played eight matches for Rushden, but fell out of favour at the club in March 2007 after Westley was sacked. As a result, Bostwick did not play for Rushden again, and was released by the club at the end of the 2006–07 season.

Ebbsfleet United
At the start of the 2007–08 season, Bostwick signed for Conference Premier club Ebbsfleet United on an initial three-month contract, with a view to a contract extension after the three-month period. He was signed to add "depth to the squad", as well as to "provide cover at the back and midfield areas". He made his Ebbsfleet debut on 18 August 2007, starting the match at centre back in a 1–0 victory at Nene Park against his former employers, Rushden. He scored his first goal for the club in a 1–1 draw against Exeter City on 22 September 2007. Bostwick signed a new contract at Ebbsfleet on 23 November 2007, keeping him signed to the club until the end of the 2007–08 season. Bostwick played regularly in the club's FA Trophy run during the season, making seven appearances in the club's FA Trophy matches, and scoring in a 1–1 draw against Aldershot Town in the semi-final second leg on 15 March 2008. He also played the full match in the Final as Ebbsfleet won 1–0 against Torquay United at Wembley Stadium on 10 May 2008. He made 51 appearances for Ebbsfleet in all competitions during the season, scoring five times.

Stevenage

Bostwick was offered a new contract by Ebbsfleet ahead of the 2008–09 season, but rejected the offer and instead opted to join fellow Conference Premier club Stevenage Borough on a two-year deal, playing under the management of Graham Westley for the second time. He made his debut for Stevenage in the club's opening match of the season, a 5–0 defeat to Wrexham at the Racecourse Ground on 9 August 2008. Bostwick was used in both the centre of defence and central midfield during the first half of the 2008–09 season, as well as playing at full back in the club's 1–0 defeat to Kettering Town in September 2008. He scored his first goal for the club on 7 October 2008, the decisive goal in the 80th-minute against Mansfield Town to give Stevenage a 3–2 victory. Bostwick scored Stevenage's first in a 2–0 away win at his former club Crawley Town on 13 April 2009, scoring with a strike from just outside the area as Stevenage finished in the final Conference Premier play-off position. He played in both of Stevenage's play-off matches against Cambridge United in April 2009, as the club lost 4–3 on aggregate. Bostwick played in all seven of the club's successful FA Trophy run that season, including playing the whole match in Stevenage's 2–0 victory against York City in the 2009 FA Trophy Final at Wembley Stadium on 9 May 2009. The FA Trophy victory meant that Bostwick had won the competition in consecutive years. Bostwick made 49 appearances in his first season at Stevenage, scoring three times.

Bostwick started in Stevenage's first match of the 2009–10 season, a 1–1 draw against Tamworth on 7 August 2009. His first goal of the season came in the club's 2–1 victory against Rushden & Diamonds at Broadhall Way on 29 August 2009, scoring from the edge of the area to give Stevenage the lead. Bostwick scored a volley away at Chester City on 19 September 2009, although due to Chester City being expelled from the league, Bostwick's goal, and subsequently Stevenage's 1–0 win, were removed from the records. Bostwick played in the club's 2–0 victory against Kidderminster Harriers at Aggborough on 17 April 2010, the match that secured Stevenage's place in the Football League for the first time in the club's history. He also played in five of the club's FA Trophy fixtures during the 2009–10 season, scoring once in a match against Dover Athletic in January 2010. He played in the 2010 FA Trophy Final at Wembley Stadium and was unable to record a third consecutive Wembley victory as Stevenage lost 2–1 to Barrow after extra time. Bostwick played 52 matches in all competitions, scoring eight times. At the end of the season, Bostwick was out of contract and Westley stated he expected him to leave, saying it would be "very difficult" to keep hold of him. Despite this, Bostwick signed a new two-year deal with Stevenage on 10 June 2010, having also attracted transfer interest from several League One clubs.

He made his Football League debut in the club's opening match of the 2010–11 season, a 2–2 draw with Macclesfield Town on 7 August 2010, playing the whole match. He scored his first goal of the season in the club's first victory in the Football League on 21 August 2010, in a 3–1 win against Stockport County, scoring with a shot from 30-yards to double Stevenage's lead just before the interval. Bostwick scored his second goal of the 2010–11 season in Stevenage's 3–1 FA Cup victory over Newcastle United on 8 January 2011. Bostwick picked up a loose pass and rifled a shot that went in off the post from 25-yards out to give Stevenage a two-goal lead. Bostwick played 51 matches during the season, scoring three goals. This included three appearances in the 2010–11 League Two play-offs following Stevenage's sixth-placed finish. Following a 3–0 aggregate victory over Accrington Stanley, Stevenage earned promotion to League One after a 1–0 win against Torquay United at Old Trafford on 28 May 2011, with Bostwick playing the whole match.

Bostwick started in Stevenage's first ever League One fixture, a 0–0 draw against Exeter City on 6 August 2011. Three days after the draw, on 9 August, Bostwick scored his first goal of the campaign in a 4–3 extra-time defeat to Championship team Peterborough United on 9 August 2011, scoring with a 25-yard shot that took the match to extra time. Bostwick signed a two-year contract extension with the club on 26 August 2011. He scored his second goal of the 2011–12 season in Stevenage's 5–1 home win over Sheffield Wednesday, with his 25-yard half-volley rebounding off of the post and into the net to give Stevenage a three-goal lead in the first-half. He played regularly during the season, making 53 appearances and scoring eight goals from midfield, as Stevenage lost 1–0 over two legs in the League One play-off semi-final. During his four seasons with the club, Bostwick made 207 appearances, scoring 22 goals.

Peterborough United

Bostwick signed for Championship club Peterborough United on a three-year contract on 9 July 2012, for an undisclosed fee. Peterborough chairman Darragh MacAnthony stated that Bostwick was manager Darren Ferguson's "number one transfer target for the summer". He made his Peterborough debut in the club's first match of the 2012–13 season, playing the whole match in a 4–0 home victory over Southend United in the League Cup on 14 August 2012. Bostwick scored his first goal for the club in his fourth appearance, halving the deficit with a "stunning volley from the edge of the area" as Peterborough lost 2–1 at home to Leeds United on 25 August 2012. He was made captain ahead of Peterborough's home match against Derby County on 27 October 2012, and opened the scoring in the match with a volley, his second goal of the season, in a 3–0 victory. Bostwick made 42 appearances for Peterborough in his first season there, scoring five goals, as Peterborough were relegated from the Championship. During the 2013–14 season, Bostwick reverted from central midfield to playing regularly at centre-back. He made 57 appearances in all competitions, scoring four times. This included six appearances in the Football League Trophy as Peterborough won the competition; Bostwick played the whole match in the Final, a 3–1 victory against Chesterfield at Wembley Stadium on 30 March 2014.

He signed a new three-and-a-half year contract with Peterborough on 10 March 2015, with MacAnthony stating Bostwick could return to his midfield role as "you can see what he brings to that position". He scored seven times in 41 matches throughout the 2014–15 season, which included ending the season scoring three times in his last two games. Having played regularly in the first-team under Ferguson for two seasons, Bostwick continued to do so under new manager Graham Westley during the 2015–16 season, who had previously managed Bostwick at Rushden & Diamonds and Stevenage. He played 43 times and scored four goals that season, with Peterborough finishing in 13th place in League One. Bostwick scored three times in 45 appearances under the management of Grant McCann throughout the 2016–17 season and was voted as Peterborough's Player of the Year for the season at the club's end-of-season awards ceremony. During his five years at Peterborough, he made 228 appearances in all competitions, scoring 23 times.

Lincoln City
Bostwick signed for newly promoted League Two club Lincoln City on a two-year contract on 20 July 2017. He joined Lincoln for an undisclosed fee, with Peterborough having received a higher offer from Blackburn Rovers, although Bostwick did not want to relocate to the north of England. He made his debut for Lincoln in the club's 2–2 draw away at Wycombe Wanderers on 5 August 2017, and scored his first goal in a 2–1 victory against Chesterfield at Sincil Bank on 7 October 2017. He made seven appearances in Lincoln's EFL Trophy campaign that season as the club won the trophy after defeating Shrewsbury Town in the 2018 EFL Trophy Final at Wembley Stadium on 8 April 2018. It was the second time Bostwick had won the trophy in his career; and the fourth cup competition he had won at Wembley Stadium. He scored six times in 51 appearances during his first season at Lincoln and was selected in the 2017–18 EFL League Two Team of the Season having helped the defence keep 17 clean sheets. Bostwick extended his contract with Lincoln for an extra year on 26 April 2018, keeping him at the club until June 2020.

During the 2018–19 season, Bostwick scored in Lincoln's FA Cup third round 2–1 defeat to Premier League club Everton on 5 January 2019. He played regularly in the centre of defence for manager Danny Cowley that season, making 49 appearances as Lincoln won promotion into League One after finishing as League Two champions. Bostwick was voted Lincoln's Player of the Year at the end of the season. Having started the 2019–20 season as a regular in the first-team line-up, Bostwick sustained a calf injury in Lincoln's 1–0 home defeat to Bristol Rovers on 14 September 2019, during which he was a substituted at half-time. He returned to the first-team in December 2019, although suffered a recurrence of the injury in a 3–1 defeat at Sunderland on 4 January 2020. Having returned to the team a month later, the regular season was curtailed due to the COVID-19 pandemic in March 2020. He was included in Lincoln's list of released players on 28 May 2020 and Bostwick left the club upon the expiry of his contract.

Burton Albion
Bostwick signed for League One club Burton Albion on 5 August 2020, on a one-year contract. The transfer materialised after Bostwick had spoken to his former teammate and Burton fitness coach Chris Beardsley about joining the club. He made his Burton debut in the club's 1–1 draw in the EFL Cup against Accrington Stanley on 4 September 2020. Bostwick was predominantly on the substitute's bench in the opening three months of the 2020–21 season, making five league appearances. He returned to the starting line-up in December 2020 and was a regular under new manager Jimmy Floyd Hasselbaink for the remainder of the season. Bostwick scored his first goal for Burton in a 2–0 away victory against Northampton Town on 13 February 2021. His goal in the match came from an indirect free-kick within Northampton's penalty area. He made 31 appearances during the season, scoring twice, as Burton finished 16th in League One having spent most of the season in the relegation places. Described as "influential" and "key" during the second half of the season, Burton confirmed that Bostwick had signed a one-year contract extension with the club in July 2021. Bostwick was released by the club at the end of the 2021–22 season.

Return to Stevenage
Having made 10 appearances for Burton throughout the first half of the 2021–22 season, during which he suffered a hamstring injury, Bostwick rejoined League Two club Stevenage on 4 January 2022, on loan for the remainder of the 2021–22 season. Bostwick played 14 times for Stevenage during the loan agreement, with the club avoiding relegation with three games remaining. His release from Burton was confirmed on 9 May 2022 and he signed for Stevenage on a permanent basis on 23 May 2022.

International career
Bostwick was called up to play for the England C team, who represent England at non-League level, in a match against Italy C in Benevento in November 2008. He came on as a 56th-minute substitute in a match that ended 2–2. He was called up again for a match against Belgium under-23s at the Kassam Stadium in May 2009, withdrawing due to injury. Bostwick was called up once more to play against Poland under-23 team in Grodzisk Wielkopolski on 20 October 2009, but again withdrew due to injury.

Personal life
With his first partner, Bostwick had two children, a daughter and a son. With his current wife he has one daughter.

Career statistics

Honours
Ebbsfleet United
FA Trophy: 2007–08

Stevenage
FA Trophy: 2008–09; runner-up: 2009–10
Conference Premier: 2009–10
Football League Two play-offs: 2011

Peterborough United
Football League Trophy: 2013–14

Lincoln City
EFL Trophy: 2017–18
EFL League Two: 2018–19

Individual
Conference Premier Team of the Year: 2009–10
Peterborough United Player of the Year: 2016–17
League Two Team of the Year: 2017–18
Lincoln City Player of the Year: 2018–19

References

External links

1988 births
Living people
Footballers from Eltham
English footballers
England semi-pro international footballers
Association football midfielders
Millwall F.C. players
Crawley Town F.C. players
Rushden & Diamonds F.C. players
Ebbsfleet United F.C. players
Stevenage F.C. players
Peterborough United F.C. players
Lincoln City F.C. players
National League (English football) players
English Football League players
Burton Albion F.C. players